Khilok is the name of several inhabited localities in Russia.

Urban localities
Khilok, Zabaykalsky Krai, a town in Khiloksky District of Zabaykalsky Krai

Rural localities
Khilok, Leningrad Oblast, a village in Osminskoye Settlement Municipal Formation of Luzhsky District of Leningrad Oblast